Taylor, Fladgate &  Yeatman (often simply Taylor Fladgate and trading under the name Taylor's) is one of the largest port wine houses.  Founded in 1692 in Vila Nova de Gaia, Portugal by Job Bearsley, becoming Taylor, Fladgate &  Yeatman when Joseph Taylor, John Alexander Fladgate and Morgan Yeatman formed a partnership in 1838,  it is also one of the oldest.  The house owns the brands of Fonseca, Fonseca-Guimaraens, Taylor, Krohn and Croft.  The house ships almost all types of port including vintage, tawny, ruby, late-bottled vintage, and white.  The house invented the style of late-bottled vintage port. Taylor Fladgate's vintage ports are some of the most sought-after and expensive ports in the world.

References

External links
Taylor Fladgate Port Wine official website

Wineries of Portugal
Companies established in 1692
Portuguese brands
Port wine